Kathy Jordan and Ann Kiyomura won in the final 6–2, 6–2 against Dianne Fromholtz and Betty Stöve.

Seeds
Champion seeds are indicated in bold text while text in italics indicates the round in which those seeds were eliminated. The top two seeded teams received byes into the quarterfinals.

 Rosemary Casals /  Sharon Walsh (semifinals)
 Kathy Jordan /  Ann Kiyomura (champions)
 Sandy Collins /  Mima Jaušovec (semifinals)
n/a

Draw

External links
 1983 WTA Congoleum Classic Doubles Draw

Doubles